"Close Rick-counters of the Rick Kind" is the tenth and penultimate episode of the first season of the American science fiction comedy television series Rick and Morty. Directed by Stephen Sandoval and written by Ryan Ridley, the episode aired on April 7, 2014. With a title alluding to Close Encounters of the Third Kind, the episode is notable for introducing both the rules of the franchise's multiverse, and the main antagonist of the first five seasons of the series — Evil Morty — whose storyline is continued across the third season episode "The Ricklantis Mixup", and the fifth season finale "Rickmurai Jack", forming a trilogy.

Plot 
The show's original Rick is wrongfully accused of murdering twenty-seven Ricks from alternate dimensions and kidnapping their respective Mortys. The Trans-Dimensional Council of Ricks arrests him and finds him guilty, upon discovering incriminating evidence which was actually fabricated to frame him. Rick and Morty escape and are chased by a few duplicates of themselves. The Smith household is flooded with other Ricks and Jerry develops a friendship with the good-natured "Doofus Rick". 

The real culprits seem to be an "Evil" Rick (who has a facial scar) and his Morty (who wears an eyepatch), who have been using Mortys' intelligence brainwaves as a way to conceal themselves. They capture the original Rick and Morty, but the original Morty leads a rebellion of alternate Mortys and releases the original Rick. Rick informs the Council about the real killer, thus clearing his own name. After Rick and Morty depart, the Council discovers that "Evil" Rick was a mindless cyborg being controlled remotely. As the Rickless Mortys leave to board a ship, "Evil" Rick's Morty removes his eyepatch — revealed to be "Evil" Rick's controller — stomps on it, and blends into the crowd.

In the post-credits scene, Jerry waves at Doofus Rick from the window, prompting Rick to make fun of him.

Reception

Viewing figures 
Upon its airing, the episode was seen by 1.75 million American viewers.

Critical reception 
Joe Matar of Den of Geek praised "Close Rick-counters of the Rick Kind", calling it "a really solid episode, both narratively and comically. Rick and Morty does some of its best comedic work when it gleefully indulges in the absurd possibilities that a sci-fi universe of limitless possibilities allows for. One of the consistently best ways Rick and Morty showcases its creativity is through chase scenes in which the characters go through all manners of sci-fi rigmarole, letting the writers and animators assault you with a barrage of blink-and-you-missed-it sight gags." Zack Handlen of The A.V. Club said "This is a show designed to answer any potential message board nitpicking in advance ... All of which makes the occasional moments of heart even more surprising and effective."

Corey Plante of Inverse thought the first season of Rick and Morty should have ended with "Close Rick-counters of the Rick Kind", with the reveal that Evil Rick's Morty was really Eyepatch Morty, a future series antagonist. Blaise Hopkins of TVOverMind praised the series' "ability to poke fun at the science fiction genre while keeping the design and comedy completely original."

References 

2014 American television episodes
Rick and Morty episodes
Gravity Falls